C.U.Shah University is a private university located in Wadhwan City, Surendranagar, Gujarat. It is run by Vardhman Bharti Trust and named after Chimanlal Ujamshibhai Shah. It had been created by the state of Gujarat under the Private University Amendment Bill in 2013

The university, spread over a 61-acre campus, is located in Wadhwan and offers 82 courses ranging from engineering, arts, commerce, education, pharmaceutical sciences, life sciences, pure sciences, social sciences, computer sciences, management, law and nursing. It offers PhD, MPhil, MTech, BTech, MBA, MCA, MSW, MLW, LL.M. (business law, criminology), BBA, BCA, M.Sc., B.Sc., B.Ed., M.Ed., B.Lib.I.Sc, M.Lib.I.Sc., B.Com., M.Com., B.A., M.A., LL.B., B.A. LL.B., LL.B., Diploma Engineering, B.Pharm., M.Pharm. (pharmaceutics, Q.A.), PGDMLT, PGDMIRT, B.Sc. (nursing), PGDCA, B.Sc. (MLT), PGD (hospital management), PGD (ECG technology), PGD (dialysis technology), PGD in counselling psychology M.Sc. (web technology), M.Sc. (CA&IT) in the disciplines enlisted.

See also
C. U. Shah College of Engineering and Technology, Surendranagar

References

External links
Official website

Private universities in India
Universities in Gujarat
Surendranagar district
2013 establishments in Gujarat
Educational institutions established in 2013